Pseudopostega is a genus of moths of the family Opostegidae.

Species 
Pseudopostega abrupta (Walsingham, 1897)
Pseudopostega accessoriella (Frey & Boll, 1876)
Pseudopostega acidata (Meyrick, 1915)
Pseudopostega acrodicra D.R. Davis & J.R. Stonis, 2007
Pseudopostega acuminata D.R. Davis & J.R. Stonis, 2007
Pseudopostega adusta (Walsingham, 1897)
Pseudopostega albogaleriella (Clemens, 1862)
Pseudopostega alleni Puplesis & Robinson, 1999
Pseudopostega amphivittata Puplesis & Robinson, 1999
Pseudopostega apotoma D.R. Davis & J.R. Stonis, 2007
Pseudopostega attenuata D.R. Davis & J.R. Stonis, 2007
Pseudopostega auritella (Hübner, 1813)
Pseudopostega beckeri D.R. Davis & J.R. Stonis, 2007
Pseudopostega bellicosa (Meyrick, 1911)
Pseudopostega bicornuta D.R. Davis & J.R. Stonis, 2007
Pseudopostega bidorsalis D.R. Davis & J.R. Stonis, 2007
Pseudopostega brachybasis D.R. Davis & J.R. Stonis, 2007
Pseudopostega breviapicula D.R. Davis & J.R. Stonis, 2007
Pseudopostega brevicaudata Stonis, Remeikis and Sruoga, 2013
Pseudopostega brevifurcata D.R. Davis & J.R. Stonis, 2007
Pseudopostega brevivalva D.R. Davis & J.R. Stonis, 2007
Pseudopostega caulifurcata D.R. Davis & J.R. Stonis, 2007
Pseudopostega chalcopepla (Walsingham, 1908)
Pseudopostega clastozona (Meyrick, 1913)
Pseudopostega clavata D.R. Davis & J.R. Stonis, 2007
Pseudopostega colognatha D.R. Davis & J.R. Stonis, 2007
Pseudopostega concava D.R. Davis & J.R. Stonis, 2007
Pseudopostega congruens (Walsingham, 1914)
Pseudopostega conicula D.R. Davis & J.R. Stonis, 2007
Pseudopostega constricta D.R. Davis & J.R. Stonis, 2007
Pseudopostega contigua D.R. Davis & J.R. Stonis, 2007
Pseudopostega crassifurcata D.R. Davis & J.R. Stonis, 2007
Pseudopostega crepusculella (Zeller, 1839)
Pseudopostega cretea (Meyrick, 1920)
Pseudopostega curtarama D.R. Davis & J.R. Stonis, 2007
Pseudopostega denticulata D.R. Davis & J.R. Stonis, 2007
Pseudopostega didyma D.R. Davis & J.R. Stonis, 2007
Pseudopostega diskusi D.R. Davis & J.R. Stonis, 2007
Pseudopostega divaricata D.R. Davis & J.R. Stonis, 2007
Pseudopostega dorsalis D.R. Davis & J.R. Stonis, 2007
Pseudopostega dorsalis dorsalis D.R. Davis & J.R. Stonis, 2007
Pseudopostega dorsalis fasciata D.R. Davis & J.R. Stonis, 2007
Pseudopostega duplicata D.R. Davis & J.R. Stonis, 2007
Pseudopostega euryntis (Meyrick, 1907)
Pseudopostega ferruginea D.R. Davis & J.R. Stonis, 2007
Pseudopostega ecuadoriana D.R. Davis & J.R. Stonis, 2007
Pseudopostega elachista (Walsingham, 1914)
Pseudopostega epactaea (Meyrick, 1907)
Pseudopostega floridensis D.R. Davis & J.R. Stonis, 2007
Pseudopostega frigida (Meyrick, 1906)
Pseudopostega fungina Puplesis & Robinson, 1999
Pseudopostega fumida D.R. Davis & J.R. Stonis, 2007
Pseudopostega galapagosae D.R. Davis & J.R. Stonis, 2007
Pseudopostega gracilis D.R. Davis & J.R. Stonis, 2007
Pseudopostega indonesica Puplesis & Robinson, 1999
Pseudopostega javae Puplesis & Robinson, 1999 
Pseudopostega kempella (Eyer, 1967)
Pseudopostega lateriplicata D.R. Davis & J.R. Stonis, 2007
Pseudopostega latiapicula D.R. Davis & J.R. Stonis, 2007
Pseudopostega latifurcata D.R. Davis & J.R. Stonis, 2007
Pseudopostega latifurcata apoclina D.R. Davis & J.R. Stonis, 2007
Pseudopostega latifurcata latifurcata D.R. Davis & J.R. Stonis, 2007
Pseudopostega latiplana  Remeikis & Stonis, 2009
Pseudopostega latisaccula D.R. Davis & J.R. Stonis, 2007
Pseudopostega lobata D.R. Davis & J.R. Stonis, 2007
Pseudopostega longifurcata D.R. Davis & J.R. Stonis, 2007
Pseudopostega longipedicella D.R. Davis & J.R. Stonis, 2007
Pseudopostega machaerias Meyrick, 1907
Pseudopostega mexicana  Remeikis & Stonis, 2009
Pseudopostega microacris D.R. Davis & J.R. Stonis, 2007
Pseudopostega microlepta (Meyrick, 1915)
Pseudopostega mignonae D.R. Davis & J.R. Stonis, 2007
Pseudopostega monosperma (Meyrick, 1931)
Pseudopostega monstruosa D.R. Davis & J.R. Stonis, 2007
Pseudopostega myxodes Meyrick, 1916
Pseudopostega napaeella (Clemens, 1872)
Pseudopostega nepalensis Puplesis & Robinson, 1999
Pseudopostega nigrimaculella Puplesis & Robinson, 1999
Pseudopostega obtusa D.R. Davis & J.R. Stonis, 2007
Pseudopostega ovatula D.R. Davis & J.R. Stonis, 2007
Pseudopostega parakempella D.R. Davis & J.R. Stonis, 2007
Pseudopostega paraplicatella D.R. Davis & J.R. Stonis, 2007
Pseudopostega paromias (Meyrick, 1915)
Pseudopostega parvilineata Puplesis & Robinson, 1999
Pseudopostega perdigna (Walsingham, 1914)
Pseudopostega pexa (Meyrick, 1920)
Pseudopostega plicatella D.R. Davis & J.R. Stonis, 2007
Pseudopostega pontifex (Meyrick, 1915)
Pseudopostega protomochla (Meyrick, 1935)
Pseudopostega pumila (Walsingham, 1914)
Pseudopostega quadristrigella (Frey and Boll, 1876)
Pseudopostega resimafurcata D.R. Davis & J.R. Stonis, 2007
Pseudopostega robusta Remeikis & Stonis, 2009
Pseudopostega rotunda D.R. Davis & J.R. Stonis, 2007
Pseudopostega sacculata (Meyrick, 1915)
Pseudopostega saltatrix (Walsingham, 1897)
Pseudopostega saturella Puplesis & Robinson, 1999
Pseudopostega sectila D.R. Davis & J.R. Stonis, 2007
Pseudopostega serrata D.R. Davis & J.R. Stonis, 2007
Pseudopostega similantis Puplesis & Robinson, 1999 
Pseudopostega spatulata D.R. Davis & J.R. Stonis, 2007
Pseudopostega spilodes Meyrick, 1915
Pseudopostega strigulata Puplesis & Robinson, 1999 
Pseudopostega sublobata D.R. Davis & J.R. Stonis, 2007
Pseudopostega subtila D.R. Davis & J.R. Stonis, 2007
Pseudopostega subviolacea Meyrick, 1920
Pseudopostega suffuscula D.R. Davis & J.R. Stonis, 2007
Pseudopostega sumbae Puplesis & Robinson, 1999 
Pseudopostega tanygnatha D.R. Davis & J.R. Stonis, 2007
Pseudopostega tenuifurcata D.R. Davis & J.R. Stonis, 2007
Pseudopostega texana D.R. Davis & J.R. Stonis, 2007
Pseudopostega triangularis D.R. Davis & J.R. Stonis, 2007
Pseudopostega trinidadensis (Busck, 1910)
Pseudopostega truncata D.R. Davis & J.R. Stonis, 2007
Pseudopostega tucumanae D.R. Davis & J.R. Stonis, 2007
Pseudopostega turquinoensis D.R. Davis & J.R. Stonis, 2007
Pseudopostega uncinata D.R. Davis & J.R. Stonis, 2007
Pseudopostega velifera Meyrick, 1920
Pseudopostega venticola (Walsingham, 1897)
Pseudopostega zelopa Meyrick, 1905

External links 
Generic Revision of the Opostegidae, with a Synoptic Catalog of the World's Species (Lepidoptera: Nepticuloidea)
A Revision of the New World Plant-Mining Moths of the Family Opostegidae (Lepidoptera: Nepticuloidea)
Contribution to the Opostegidae Fauna of Central America, with an Updated Checklist and Description of New Species from Costa Rica and Mexico (Insecta: Lepidoptera)

Monotrysia genera
Opostegidae